The battle of Fjaler was an engagement related to Harald Fairhair's unification of Norway.

After having subdued the kingdom of Firda, Harald left for the east, placing Håkon Ladejarl in possession of Firda. Håkon sent a messenger to earl Atle Mjove in Sogn, telling him the king Harald had given the order that Atle should give Sogn to him. Atle answered that he would do no such thing unless told by the king in person. Both earls then gathered an army, and they clashed by a place called Fialar in Sunnfjord. Both earls were killed in the battle.

References
 Snorri Sturluson. Heimskringla: History of the Kings of Norway, translated Lee M. Hollander. Reprinted University of Texas Press, Austin, 1992. 

Fjaler
9th century in Norway
Fjaler
Fjaler